Rudolf Dreikurs (February 8, 1897, ViennaMay 25, 1972, Chicago)  was an Austrian psychiatrist and educator who developed psychologist Alfred Adler's system of individual psychology into a pragmatic method for understanding the purposes of reprehensible behaviour in children and for stimulating cooperative behaviour without punishment or reward.

He suggested that human misbehavior is the result of feeling a lack of belonging to one's social group. When this happens the child acts from one of four "mistaken goals": undue attention, power, revenge or avoidance (inadequacy). His overall goal was that students would learn to cooperate reasonably without being penalized or rewarded because they would feel that they are valuable contributors to the classroom.

In 1952, Dreikurs organized a group of followers of Adlerian Psychology to found the North American Society of Adlerian Psychology. He was an active leader in the organization until his death.

Bibliography
A Parent's Guide to Child Discipline, by Rudolf Dreikurs and Loren Grey.
The Challenge of Marriage.
The Challenge of Parenthood.
Children: The Challenge, by Rudolf Dreikurs, Vicki Soltz.   
Coping With Children's Misbehavior, a Parent's Guide.
Discipline Without Tears, by Rudolf Dreikurs, et al. 
Encouraging Children to Learn, by Rudolf Dreikurs, Don, Sr. Dinkmeyer.
Family council: the Dreikurs technique for putting an end to war between parents and children (and between children and children).
Fundamentals of Adlerian Psychology.
Maintaining Sanity in the Classroom: Classroom Management Techniques, by Rudolf Dreikurs, et al. 
New Approach to Discipline: Logical Consequences.
Psychology in the Classroom: A Manual for Teachers.
Social Equality the Challenge of Today.

See also
List of Austrian scientists
List of Austrians
Adlerian
Classical Adlerian psychology

References

 The Courage to Be Imperfect: The Life and Work of Rudolf Dreikurs. Biography by Janet Terner, W.L. Pew. New York 1978.
 Rudolf Dreikurs — A Biographical Summary, by Eva Dreikurs Ferguson, copyright 2008. Available from www.icassi.net/rudolf-dreikurs/. Retrieved October 3, 2022.

External links 
 AdlerPedia
 Centro de Estudios Adlerianos - Uruguay
 International Committee for Adlerian Summer Schools and Institutes - ICASSI 

Adlerian psychology
Austrian psychologists
20th-century American psychologists
American people of Austrian-Jewish descent
Jewish American writers
Family and parenting writers
Austrian Jews
Physicians from Vienna
University of Vienna alumni
1897 births
1972 deaths
20th-century American Jews
Austrian emigrants to the United States